City of Fear is the fourth album by FM, a progressive rock group from Toronto, Canada, released in 1980 on Passport Records and distributed in Canada by Capitol Records, catalogue number PB-2028, and in the USA on Passport distributed by Jem Records, catalogue number PB-6004.  It was produced by Larry Fast who was notable for his Synergy series of electronic music albums. A remastered edition was released by Esoteric Records (ECLEC2383) on March 25, 2013.

Track listing
All compositions by FM (Martin Deller, Ben Mink, Cameron Hawkins), all lyrics by Hawkins.
Side one
"Krakow" – 4:37
"Power" – 3:28
"Truth or Consequences" – 4:13
"Lost and Found" – 4:25
"City of Fear" – 5:07

Side two
"Surface to Air" – 5:18
"Up to You" – 4:21
"Silence" – 3:22
"Riding the Thunder" – 4:06
"Nobody at All" – 4:09

Personnel

Martin Deller – Gretsch drums, Zildjian and Paiste cymbals, glockenspiel, Moog percussion controller with Minimoog, PAiA programmable drum synthesizer, tympani
Ben Mink – 5 string "bent" mandolin (electric), 5 string "Violite" (electric violin), 5 string viola (acoustic), 1912 "The Gibson" mandolin (acoustic), Fender amplifiers, vocals
Cameron Hawkins – lead vocals, Mutron and Electro-Harmonix FX pedals, 9.95, Prophet 5, Minimoog, (Moog) Taurus pedals, ELKA (synthesizer), Yamaha grand (piano), Rickenbacker bass, Polyfusion sequencer, Larry's Moog 15 (modular synthesizer), Mellotron
Additional personnel
Pamela Silverstein – spoken word

Technical credits

Produced by Larry Fast
Engineered by Jim Frank and Charles Conrad, assisted by Scott Rea and Cliff Hodsdon
Production assistance by Ian Murray
Recorded at Soundstage, Toronto, Canada, and House of Music, West Orange, New Jersey, USA
Additional material recorded at Phase One, Toronto by Mark Wright
Mastered by Bub Ludwig at Masterdisk, New York City, USA
Synthy maintenance by Rob Onedera
Pre-production with Ed Stone, Ian Dunbar, Jim Frank, Ian Murray, Mark Wright
Art direction and design: Murray Brenman
Photography – cover: Eric Staller
Photography – insider cover: Paul Till
Photography – stand-ups: Bob Rock (the cover art features time lapse photography using life-size cardboard cut-out images of the group's members)

External links 
 Album information at Blacknoise website

1980 albums
FM (Canadian band) albums
Passport Records albums